Jesper Hansen may refer to:
 Jesper Hansen (footballer, born 1985), Danish football player
 Jesper Hansen (cricketer) (born 1980), Danish cricketer
 Jesper Hansen (football manager) (born 1963), Danish football manager and former player
 Jesper Hansen (sport shooter), Danish sport shooter
 Jesper Hansen (cyclist) (born 1990), Danish cyclist